Vasilev or Vassilev, feminine Vassileva or Vassileva, is a Bulgarian surname. Notable people with the surname include:

 Aleksandar Vasilev (disambiguation), multiple people
Anton Vasilev (born 1983), Russian sprint canoeist
Asparuh Vasilev (born 1981), Bulgarian footballer
Boyko Vasilev (born 1970), Bulgarian journalist 
Dimitar Vasilev (1903–?), Bulgarian fencer
Doychin Vasilev (born 1944), Bulgarian mountain climber and cinematographer
Georgi Vasilev (disambiguation), multiple people
Ilian Vassilev (born 1956), Bulgarian diplomat and writer
Indiana Vassilev (born 2001), American association football player
Ivaylo Vasilev (disambiguation), multiple people
Ivan Vasilev (born 1967), Bulgarian footballer
Kyril Vassilev (1908–1987), Bulgarian-American portrait painter
Mikhail Vasilev (born 1961), Russian handball player
Milen Vasilev (born 1988), Bulgarian footballer
Mladen Vasilev (born 1947), Bulgarian footballer and manager
Nikolay Vasilev (born 1969), Bulgarian politician and economist
Petar Vasilev (footballer) (born 1983), Bulgarian footballer
Petar B. Vasilev (1918–2001), Bulgarian film director and screenwriter
Petko Vasilev (born 1990), Bulgarian footballer
Radoslav Vasilev (born 1990), Bulgarian footballer
Steven A. Vasilev (born 1954), American physician
Tsonyo Vasilev (born 1952), Bulgarian footballer
Tsvetan Vasilev (born 1959), Bulgarian entrepreneur and financier
Vasil Vasilev (disambiguation), multiple people
Vasko Vassilev (born 1970), Bulgarian violinist and conductor
Ventsislav Vasilev (born 1988), Bulgarian footballer
Vesselin Vassilev (born 1974), French-Bulgarian artist painter and printmaker
Vladislav Vasilev (born 1982), Bulgarian footballer

Vassileva:
Antoaneta Vassileva (born 1960), Bulgarian professor of economics
Hristina Vassileva (born 1984), Bulgarian figure skater
Nadejda Vassileva (born 1985), Bulgarian tennis player
Ralitsa Vassileva (born 1967), Bulgarian journalist
Svetla Vassileva (disambiguation), multiple people

See also
Vasilyev
3930 Vasilev, main-belt asteroid
Vasilev Bay, bay in Antarctica

Bulgarian-language surnames
Patronymic surnames
Surnames from given names